V. Rajagopal (born 1 July 1927) is an Indian former cricket umpire. He stood in one Test match, India vs. New Zealand, in 1969.

See also
 List of Test cricket umpires
 New Zealand cricket team in India in 1969–70

References

1927 births
Possibly living people
Place of birth missing (living people)
Indian Test cricket umpires